Lake Lenore Caves State Park is a Washington State Park in the Lenore Canyon extending into the hills from the shore of Lake Lenore. It is part of the Ice Age Floods National Geologic Trail. Lake Lenore and the rock shelter "caves" were caused by basalt coulee cliffs underscoured by the Missoula floods, the same floods that created the Channeled Scablands.

There are indications that Native Americans used the caves for shelter. Some petroglyphs are in the caves.

References

Sources

External links

 (covered with Dry Falls Visitor Center)
Lake Lenore Caves, Washington Trails Association

Parks in Grant County, Washington
Petroglyphs in Washington (state)
State parks of Washington (state)